Forbidden Love is a 1927 German silent drama film directed by Friedrich Feher and starring Magda Sonja, Evi Eva, and Paul Otto.

The film's sets were designed by the art director Gustav A. Knauer.

Cast

References

Bibliography

External links

1927 films
1927 drama films
Films of the Weimar Republic
German silent feature films
German drama films
Films directed by Friedrich Feher
German black-and-white films
Silent drama films
1920s German films
1920s German-language films